Zwerndorf  may refer to the following places in Austria:
 Zwerndorf (Sankt Pölten), part of Sankt Pölten
 Zwerndorf (Weiden an der March), part of Weiden an der March